Jerup is a village in Frederikshavn Municipality, Vendsyssel, in northern Jutland in Denmark.

Jerup's population is 571 (1 January 2022).

Jerup is served by Jerup railway station, located on the Skagensbanen railway line.

Notable people 
 Inger Andersen (born 1958 in Jerup) a Danish economist and environmentalist; the Executive Director of the United Nations Environment Programme, UNEP

References

Villages in Denmark
Frederikshavn Municipality